The Australian Film Institute International Award for Best Actress was an award in the annual Australian Film Institute Awards (by AFI). It was awarded from 2005-2010. The award has been superseded by the AFI's AACTA International Award for Best Actress.

Previous winners and nominees

 2005: Emily Browning - Lemony Snicket's A Series of Unfortunate Events  
 2006: Rachel Griffiths -  Six Feet Under  
Toni Collette - In Her Shoes 
Naomi Watts - King Kong
Radha Mitchell - Silent Hill
 2007: Rose Byrne - Damages 
Toni Collette - Little Miss Sunshine 
Jacinda Barrett - The Last Kiss
Rachel Griffiths - Brothers & Sisters
 2008: Cate Blanchett - Elizabeth: The Golden Age 
Judy Davis - The Starter Wife 
Rachel Griffiths - Brothers & Sisters
Nicole Kidman - The Golden Compass 
 2009: Toni Collette - United States of Tara 
Rose Byrne - Damages 
Melissa George - In Treatment
Mia Wasikowska - In Treatment 
 2010: Mia Wasikowska - Alice in Wonderland 
Toni Collette - United States of Tara, Season 2.
Bojana Novakovic - Edge of Darkness
Naomi Watts - Mother and Child

Australian Film Institute Awards
Film awards for lead actress